Albert Paul Durant (born 1 July 1892, date of death unknown) was a Belgian water polo player who competed in the 1912 Summer Olympics, 1920 Summer Olympics, and in the 1924 Summer Olympics. He was part of the Belgian team, which was able to win three consecutive medals.

See also
 Belgium men's Olympic water polo team records and statistics
 List of Olympic medalists in water polo (men)
 List of men's Olympic water polo tournament goalkeepers

References

External links
 

1892 births
Year of death missing
Belgian male water polo players
Water polo goalkeepers
Water polo players at the 1912 Summer Olympics
Water polo players at the 1920 Summer Olympics
Water polo players at the 1924 Summer Olympics
Olympic water polo players of Belgium
Olympic silver medalists for Belgium
Olympic bronze medalists for Belgium
Medalists at the 1924 Summer Olympics
Medalists at the 1920 Summer Olympics
Medalists at the 1912 Summer Olympics
Sportspeople from Brussels
20th-century Belgian people